The 2000 NCAA Division II football rankings are from the American Football Coaches Association (AFCA). For the preseason and the first 3 weeks of the season, the poll consisted of 25 teams. Starting with week 4 of the season, the poll was segregated into four regions, with 10 teams ranked in each region. 2000 was the only year this regional poll was attempted. In 2001, the AFCA went back to a "Top 25" nationally.

Legend

The American Football Coaches Association poll (Preseason and 3 Weeks of Season)

Midwest Region poll (Weeks 4 through 10)

Northeast Region poll (Weeks 4 through 10)

South Region poll (Weeks 4 through 10)

West Region poll (Weeks 4 through 10)

Notes

References

Rankings
NCAA Division II football rankings